Rathdrum railway station is a railway station in Rathdrum, County Wicklow, Ireland.

History
It opened on 18 July 1863, replacing the terminus at Rathdrum (Kilcommon) (opened 20 August 1861) when the line was extended.

Description
It is a two-platform station with a passing loop, and water tower at the south end of one platform. There is a tunnel to the south and a viaduct to the north of the station.

The station is unstaffed, and has commuter and InterCity trains to Dublin Connolly and Rosslare Europort.

There used to be a third platform and a goods area, which is now a small industrial area.

Services/routes

The service from the station is:

Monday to Friday
5 trains per day to Dublin Connolly via Bray Daly (one continuing to Dundalk Clarke)
4 trains per day to Rosslare Europort via Arklow
1 train per day to Wexford O'Hanrahan via Arklow

Saturdays
4 trains per day to Dublin Connolly via Bray Daly (one continuing to Dundalk Clarke)
3 trains per day to Rosslare Europort via Arklow

Sundays
3 trains per day to Dublin Connolly via Bray Daly
3 trains per day to Rosslare Europort via Arklow

Transport
The Wicklow Way bus service operates two routes linking Rathdrum railway station and Rathdrum with Glendalough and Tinahely respectively. The bus timetable is integrated with the train timetable.

Bus Eireann route 133, from Wicklow to Dublin Airport, stops outside Suttons in Rathdrum, which is located 650 m from the station.

See also 
 List of railway stations in Ireland

References

External links 

Irish Rail webpage of Rathdrum station

Iarnród Éireann stations in County Wicklow
Railway stations in County Wicklow
Railway stations opened in 1863